Dirsekkaya is a village in the Çıldır District, Ardahan Province, Turkey. Its population is 94 (2021).

References

Villages in Çıldır District